Langshan may refer to:

Mountains
 Mount Langshan, in Hunan, China
 Lang Mountains, mountain range in Inner Mongolia, China
 Langshan (Nantong), hill in Nantong, China

Chicken breeds
 Croad Langshan
 German Langshan
 Australian Langshan
 Modern Langshan